Tigran Oganesovich Khudaverdyan (born 28 December 1981) is a Russian businessman, former executive at Yandex N.V.

Early life
Born in Yerevan, Armenian SSR in 1981, Khudaverdian graduated from the Moscow State University, physics department in 2004. Before joining Yandex, he participated in developing internet projects and headed a web studio.

Career
Tigran Khudaverdyan joined Yandex in April 2006, as a project manager for portal services and technologies. Since then he has led several successful Yandex projects, including Yandex.Browser and Yandex.Navigator.

From 2009 to 2012, he was Head of Division for Portal Products and Mobile Apps. Since 2012 he has been the Head of Direction for Yandex.Browser and Yandex.Taxi and has been appointed Head of Product Development in 2013.

He moved to the Yandex.Taxi business in 2015, and has served as chief executive officer of MLU B.V., ride-hailing and food delivery joint venture with Uber, since its formation.

In 2019 Tigran Khudaverdyan was appointed as Deputy CEO of Yandex N.V. and joined the company's Board of Directors.

In 2019 he was featured in Young Global Leaders list initiated by the World Economic Forum.

In 2020 he attended the World Economic Forum in Davos as a speaker of "Inequality: A Barrier to Economic Growth" discussion.

In March 2022 Tigran Khudaverdyan stepped down from his roles as executive director and deputy CEO at Yandex NV.

Personal life
Tigran is married and has five sons.

International sanctions
In March 2022, the European Union sanctioned Khudaverdyan as part of its package of economic penalties against Russia for the invasion of Ukraine.

References 

Armenian businesspeople
21st-century Armenian people
1981 births
Yandex people
Businesspeople from Yerevan
Russian computer scientists
Moscow State University alumni
Russian chief executives
21st-century Russian businesspeople
Living people